= Saudi Philosophy Association =

Non-profit, civil association in Saudi Arabia

- Formation: November 2020; 4 years ago
- Headquarters: Riyadh
- Chairman of Board of Directors: Abdullah Al-Mutairi
- Website: saudiphilosophy.com

Saudi Philosophy Association (Arabic: جمعية الفلسفة - السعودية) it is a non-profit, civil association concerned with the philosophical field in Saudi Arabia. It was established in November 2020, and it is the first philosophical association in Saudi Arabia.
